Samco (Sai Gon Mechanical Engineering Corporation,) is a Vietnamese state-owned manufacturer of automobiles, buses and automobile spare parts, as well as a builder of commercial and emergency vehicle bodies. The company was established in 1975 as the Đô Thành factory, to produce parts for transportation vehicles.

Subsidiaries
 Kumho Samco lines, providing bus services in southern Vietnam

References

External links
 SAMCO

Manufacturing companies based in Ho Chi Minh City
Vehicle manufacturing companies established in 1975
Vietnamese brands
Bus manufacturers of Vietnam
Car manufacturers of Vietnam
Vietnamese companies established in 1975